Robert Doucet Boyce, known as Sluggo, is a professional skateboarder, snowboarder, break-dancer, gymnast, stuntman, and businessman from Vancouver, British Columbia.

Early life 

Sluggo was born in Victoria, British Columbia where he started as a gymnast winning the Western Canadian Championships at age 13. He also did breakdancing and won several competitions and placed 5th in a North American break-dance contest.

Skateboarding career 
Boyce began his skateboard career at 16 on the advice of a classmate. At 16, a friend suggested the name Sluggo, because of his supposed resemblance to the character in the comic strip Nancy. Sluggo honed his vertical skateboard skills at the Richmond Skate Ranch, owned by Kevin Harris, a local pro skater for Powell Peralta.  This is where he would also meet his future crew, best friends, and business partners Colin McKay, and Moses Itkonen.  The crew came to be known as the "Red Dragons".

Best known for his skateboarding, Sluggo was also the first person to perform a back flip to fakie on a vertical skate ramp. Sluggo shares ownership of a skateboarding distribution company, Centre Distribution, and oversees the day-to-day operations of RDS Skate Supply and Red Dragon Apparel. 

Sluggo caught the eye of Stacey Peralta, director of the Dog-town documentary, and owner of Powell Peralta Skateboards. Stacey introduced Sluggo to Henry Hester, a skateboard legend from Southern California who ran G&S. Sluggo rode for G&S from 1988 till 1990. Later Sluggo would ride for Real Skateboards owned by Tommy Guererro and Jim Thiebaud from Peralta’s world famous "Bones Brigade".

Sluggo turned pro in 1991 and traveled to the World Championships in Munster, Germany and competed for the first time against his childhood heroes Chris Miller, Tony Hawk and a long list of highly regarded veteran skaters.  Sluggo placed 5th in his first international competition.

Skateboarding took a down turn in the public eye from 1993 - 1996. Sluggo still continued to skate and compete all over the world but the industry had downsized. Vertical skateboarding had fallen out of favor and street skating had taken over.
The Red Dragons have always prided themselves on being well rounded skaters who skated everything that they had at their disposal which was usually downtown Vancouver, the breeding ground for some of the best skateboarders in the world.

Sluggo retired from snowboarding professionally in 2000 but continued to skateboard professionally until 2004. He came out of retirement briefly to compete in the Canadian Half-Pipe Championship in March 2005 and won the event.

Snowboarding 
In 1992, Sluggo’s younger brother Dave Boyce introduced him to snowboarding, and he quickly rose to success in that sport as well. After two seasons under his belt, he became one of Canada’s most published snowboarders showing up in almost every snowboard magazine that came out in 1994. This opened the doors to many sponsorship deals and trips all over the world to film and shoot photos. Was sponsored by snowboard manufacture, World Industries and had a signature board. Not many boards were produced and are impossible to find in good condition.

Stunt performer 
Sluggo is now a full UBCP union stunt performer in the Canadian movie industry.  He started his stunt career doubling Dean Cain in a Wesley Snipes production, Future Sport.  Sluggo has over 60 TV and feature credits to his name either acting or stunting. His daughter Araya boyce has recently started pursuing an acting career and has already featured in an independent film about girl skaters in the 90s.

Boyce was skate coordinator on the NBC TV series Sk8.

Personal life 
He has two children, Liam and Araya.

References 

Businesspeople from British Columbia
Canadian skateboarders
Canadian male snowboarders
Sportspeople from Victoria, British Columbia
Living people
Year of birth missing (living people)